Dicksee may refer to:

 Thomas Francis Dicksee, (1819–1895), English painter.
 Frank Bernard Dicksee (1853–1928), English painter.
 Herbert Dicksee (1862–1942), English painter.